The Huang River is a tributary of the Huai River in Henan Province, Central China. The Huang rises in southeastern Xin County and flows northward across the Guangshan County and Huangchuan County to reach its mouth at the northeastern Xuezi Town of the Huangchuan County.

Notes

Tributaries of the Huai River
Rivers of Henan